The Chapel of Our Lady of the Mount is a Roman Catholic church dedicated to the Virgin Mary in Old Goa, India. It is one of the oldest churches in the city and was built between 1510 and 1519. The construction of the church was ordered by Afonso de Albuquerque, the governor of Portuguese India, immediately after the Portuguese conquest of Goa in 1510. The chapel was completed in 1519.

The chapel is located on a hill overlooking the Mandovi river, and is not easily accessible. It was built using laterite stone and the architectural style is Baroque with Mannerist influences. Every year in November, the chapel courtyard plays host to the popular Monte Music Festival.

Until 2001, the chapel was in ruins. A restoration project was then planned and funded by the Fundação Oriente, an organisation that maintains cultural links of Goa and Damaon with Portugal, in association with the state government.

References

External links
Chapel of Our Lady of the Mount - Goa Tourism
Chapel of Our Lady of the Mount - Lonely Planet

Roman Catholic churches in Old Goa
Colonial Goa
Monuments and memorials in Goa
Tourist attractions in Goa
Roman Catholic churches completed in 1519
1519 establishments in India
1510s establishments in Portuguese India
Baroque architecture in India
Portuguese colonial architecture in India
1519 establishments in the Portuguese Empire
16th-century Roman Catholic church buildings in India